Aleksey Sinkevich (born 10 June 1977) is a Belarusian gymnast. He competed at the 1996 Summer Olympics and the 2000 Summer Olympics.

References

External links
 

1977 births
Living people
Belarusian male artistic gymnasts
Olympic gymnasts of Belarus
Gymnasts at the 1996 Summer Olympics
Gymnasts at the 2000 Summer Olympics
Sportspeople from Vitebsk
20th-century Belarusian people
21st-century Belarusian people